Phillips Distilling Company is a beverage manufacturer and distributor based in Princeton, Minnesota, USA. A family-owned corporation, it produces a variety of alcoholic drink products. At one point it was the largest liquor distributor in the United States.

Phillips main products include vodka, gin, rum, Canadian whisky, brandy and schnapps. Some of its brands include UV Vodka and Prairie Vodka. Phillips also produces specialty drinks such as Revel Stoke Spiced Whisky, Gin-Ka, Phillips Union Whiskey, a 100 proof series of schnapps, and an herbal liqueur named Black 100. 

The company acquired the Kamora and Leroux brands from Beam Suntory in 2021.

References

External links 

Companies based in Minnesota
Food and drink companies established in 1912
1912 establishments in Minnesota
Microdistilleries
Distilleries in Minnesota